Blizno may refer to the following places:
Blizno, Kuyavian-Pomeranian Voivodeship (north-central Poland)
Blizno, Masovian Voivodeship (east-central Poland)
Blizno, West Pomeranian Voivodeship (north-west Poland)